Petroscirtes marginatus is a species of combtooth blenny found in the western Pacific ocean.  This species reaches a length of  SL.

References

marginatus
Fish described in 1976